Filip Bilbija (born 24 April 2000) is a German footballer who plays as a midfielder for  club Hamburger SV.

Career
Bilbija made his professional debut for FC Ingolstadt in the 3. Liga on 22 July 2019, coming on as a substitute in the 67th for Fatih Kaya in the 2–1 away win against Carl Zeiss Jena.

On 3 June 2022, Bilbija signed a four-year contract with Hamburger SV.

References

External links
 Profile at DFB.de
 Profile at kicker.de

2000 births
Living people
Footballers from Berlin
German footballers
Association football midfielders
FC Ingolstadt 04 players
Hamburger SV players
Oberliga (football) players
3. Liga players
2. Bundesliga players